The 2019–20 Sporting de Gijón season was the club's 114th season in existence and the club's 48th season in the second tier of Spanish football, and the third year since its most recent relegation. It covered a period from 1 July 2019 to 20 July 2020, when the last league match was played.

Season overview

Pre-season
The pre-season started with Roberto Canella leaving Real Sporting after 20 years and playing more than 300 games with the Rojiblancos.

The first signing of the season was midfielder Javi Fuego, who came back to the team after twelve years.

On successive days, other players with experience in the league like Unai Medina or Álvaro Vázquez and Argentine Damián Pérez joined the club. On 17 July 2019, after days of negotiations, Real Sporting signed Manu García from Manchester City. The Asturian midfielder came back to Gijón five years after leaving Mareo, and agreed to a five-year contract.

August
The season started with a 1–1 draw at Girona in a match where Real Sporting finished with 10 players after Damián Pérez was ejected. Aitor García scored in the 88th minute but just one minute later, Borja García made the equalizer for the Catalans.

One week later, Real Sporting nailed another draw, at home against Rayo Vallecano. Borja López netted his first goal with the Rojiblancos but Andrés scored in the second half of a match where the video assistant referee was heavily criticized as it excessively interrupted the match.

September
The first win of the season arrived in the third game, a 2–0 victory over Albacete after a good second half, with two Asturians netting their first goals with the club: Pedro Díaz and Manu García.

After this win, Real Sporting had their first loss at Huesca. In this match, Pedro Díaz was sent off, and the referee received many protests. In the next match, the team only got one point against Deportivo, in which the video assistant referee gave them a penalty kick in the additional time. José Alberto was criticized again for playing too defensively when the team was winning 1–0. Đurđević scored his first goal in this match, just two days after his contract extension until 2023.

The team was criticized during the rest of the month, as they earned two more points in the next three matches.

October
Despite starting the month with a huge win against Almería, criticism came back three days later, when the team was defeated at debutants Fuenlabrada by 2–0. The awful performance was worse in the next week, where Real Sporting lost its first home match. Alcorcón scored three goals in the first half and finished winning 1–3.

José Alberto was heavily criticized again, but the board of directors continued trusting in him. This trust signified the next week's win at Elche with a single goal of Manu García, who did not play the previous match as he was called up for the under-21 Spanish team. This was the first win out of El Molinón.

Finally, a routing 4–0 win against Zaragoza seemed to be a reaction for trying to come back to the top half of the table.

November
A 3–1 loss at Cádiz with a very controversial penalty kick was the start of another outrageous month for Real Sporting. José Alberto could only earn one more point before his possible dismissal. This point was at the Asturian derby against Oviedo, in a goalless match played without Manu García, called up again for the under-21 national team.

The 0–2 loss against Tenerife would not improve the things in Gijón. José Alberto tried to blame the VAR, that called for a penalty against the team with 0–0 in the scoreboard, but the performance did not improve and the team was very close to the relegation positions. However, finally Miguel Torrecilla, club's director of football ratified his job and the coach continued at least one more week at the helm.

December
December was a good month in league for Real Sporting, and specially for Uroš Đurđević, as it won two consecutive matches against Ponferradina and Lugo, with three goals of the Serbian striker.

However, the criticism to the performance despite the wins and a 2–1 defeat against fourth-tier team Zamora in the Copa del Rey stained the team's reaction. This was the first loss of Real Sporting against a Tercera División team ever.

Finally, 2019 ended with José Alberto being sacked after a new home loss against Extremadura, with an own goal of Carlos Crdero. Serbian manager Miroslav Đukić was hired the following day.

January
Đukić's was going to be on 3 January at Zaragoza. However, the match was postponed four days to the flu of eleven players. It finally ended with a 0–2 loss, starting with a goal against at the second minute of the match.

The next match would go better, as Real Sporting beat Elche with a lonely goal of Manu García in the 87th minute. This match was Đukić's debut at El Molinón and, despite winning, the new coach recognized the team must improve its football.

On 30 January 2020, Real Sporting announced the loan of Isma Cerro to Badajoz until the end of the season and one day later, Neftali Manzambi to Valencia Mestalla. The club only added one player to the squad: Murilo Costa, loaned from Portuguese club Braga.

February and March
After the 2–2 home draw against Copa del Rey semifinalist Mirandés, Đukić stated that staying only three points over the relegation positions, the objective of the season can't be other than avoiding relegation.

However, the team responded to this situation by winning the two next matches: the first one at El Sardinero, in a sold-out match with 3,000 people from Gijón, where Murilo scored his first goal and helped to beat Racing Santander 2–0, and the second one against leaders Cádiz, with the supporters agreeing the team had improved since the last bad streak.

After a loss at Ponferradina, the last match played by Real Sporting before the suspension of the league due to the coronavirus pandemic was a wide 4–0 win against Las Palmas.

Recommence
On 4 May, Real Sporting announced that Miguel Torrecilla would leave the club on 30 June and hired Javi Rico as new director of football.

After all players being tested of COVID-19 on 7 May, players will face their first training on 11 May.

Real Sporting played its first match after the suspension at Estadio Riazor, A Coruña, and only earned one point after a goalless draw against Deportivo La Coruña.

The first match at home was the Asturian derby, that Real Sporting lost 0–1 against Oviedo.

Real Sporting finished the season in the 13th position, equalising the club's worst classification ever.

Players

Current squad

Reserve team

In

Out

Technical staff

Managerial changes

Pre-season and friendlies

Competitions

Segunda División

League table

Results summary

Positions by round

Matches

Copa del Rey

Statistics

Appearances and goals

|-
|colspan="12"|Players who have left the club after the start of the season:

Disciplinary record

|-
|colspan=17 align=left|Players who have left the club after the start of the season:

Women's team

Real Sporting made their debut in the new second-tier league Segunda División Pro. The team gained their place after the withdrawal of Atlántida Matamá.

This was its 24th season ever, the 19th in the second tier.

Overview
On 3 January 2019, assistant coach Rafael Bernal replaced Ricardo Alonso as head coach.

Despite being in the last position, Real Sporting remained in the league after it ended prematurely due to the COVID-19 pandemic.

Squad

League

League table

Results summary

Positions by round

Matches

Appearances and goals

|-
|colspan=8 align=left|Players who have left the club after the start of the season:

References

External links 

Sporting Gijón
Sporting de Gijón seasons